Trevor Christopher Wright is a former American actor.

Early life
Wright was raised in La Jolla, California.

Career
His breakthrough acting lead role was in the 2007 film Shelter as Zach.

His recurring role as Zack Powers on George Lopez and guest starring in television series such as NYPD Blue, Scrubs and Boston Public led to his being named in 2003 by Teen Vogue as a "young and upcoming star that's here to stay".

His very first break came through his involvement in music videos when, in 1989, Wright, along with fellow actor Elijah Wood, appeared in the video for Paula Abdul's single "Forever Your Girl," directed by David Fincher. He subsequently starred opposite singer Stacie Orrico in the videos for her singles "Stuck" (2003), and "I Could Be the One" (2004).

His first feature-film role was in 1993's Memories by Joe Frank, but his first major role was as "Zach" in the 2007 independent film Shelter, directed by Jonah Markowitz and co-starring Brad Rowe, Tina Holmes and Ross Thomas. His role brought him three awards for Best Male Lead at the Dallas Out Takes, and Best Actor and Audience Awards at Tampa International Gay and Lesbian Film Festival.

Wright's film roles include Vicious Circle, in which he appeared in the role of the character "Fin".  He was the lead actor in Vacancy 2: The First Cut, that had a straight to DVD release on January 20, 2009.  His 2010 films include The Social Network and 2001 Maniacs: Field of Screams.

Wright changed careers in 2012 and became a real estate agent in Los Angeles.

Personal life
He was engaged to actress Odette Annable ( Yustman) until their breakup in 2008. He resides in Los Angeles, California.

Wright enjoys skateboarding, snowboarding, surfing and other similar activities.

Filmography

Appearances in Music videos
 1989: "Forever Your Girl" (by Paula Abdul) -- as Young James Dean
 2003: "Stuck" by Stacie Orrico
 2004: "I Could Be the One" by Stacie Orrico

Awards
 Best Male Lead, Dallas Out Takes - Shelter
 Best Actor, Tampa International Gay and Lesbian Film Festival - Shelter
 Audience Award, Tampa International Gay and Lesbian Film Festival - Shelter

References

External links
 

20th-century American male actors
21st-century American male actors
Male actors from California
American male child actors
American male film actors
American male television actors
Living people
People from La Jolla, San Diego
Place of birth missing (living people)
Year of birth missing (living people)